Escapade romaine is a 2010 documentary film by Jérémie Carboni during the tour of Daniel Pennac's reading.

Synopsis 
French filmmaker Jérémie Carboni followed French writer Daniel Pennac during rehearsals of Bartleby the scrivener's reading in Pépinière Opéra theatre in Paris. This video describes Daniel Pennac's performance in Rome, during the tour.

Cast and Crew

Stars
 Daniel Pennac - Himself.
 François Duval -  Himself.

References

External links 
 
 Production company official website : https://web.archive.org/web/20120119123514/http://www.zerkalo.fr/

Documentary films about writers
2010 films
2010 documentary films
French documentary films
Films shot in Rome
Herman Melville
Films directed by Jérémie Carboni
2010s French films